Than Phu Ying Suthawan Sathirathai is the only daughter of Than Phu Ying Busba Kitiyakara (younger sister of Queen Sirikit), thus first  cousin of the current king. She is the wife of Surakiart Sathirathai, former Deputy Prime Minister in charge of foreign affairs under the government of Thaksin Shinawatra. She was a lecturer in environmental economics at Chulalongkorn University.

Education and early career
She began studied at Chulalongkorn University Demonstration School until grade 5 and then moved to Chitralada School. She studied in bachelor's degree at the Department of Electrical Engineering, Faculty of Engineering Chulalongkorn University. After graduating with a master's degree in economics from Tufts University, United States she became an environmental researcher at the Thailand Development Research Institute (TDRI) and was funded by the British Council to study doctoral degree in Land Economy at Cambridge University, England.

He returned to serve as a lecturer at the Faculty of Economics, Chulalongkorn University as deputy director of the Ecology Economics Center and became the head of the education project, she produced research results on environmental impacts in the case of the construction of Kaeng Suea Ten Dam.

At present, She resigned from government service as an independent scholar and established The State Institute for Social and Environmental Development Foundation is an academic NGO aimed at conducting studies and research with an emphasis on public participation to lead to good management and fairness to society and the environment.

Ancestry

References

Further reading
  Sarakadee Magazine, สัมภาษณ์ ท่านผู้หญิง ดร.สุธาวัลย์ เสถียรไทย (Interview with Thanphuying Dr.Suthawan Sathirathai), Vol. 20, No. 233

Living people
Suthawan Sathirathai
1958 births
Suthawan Sathirathai
Suthawan Sathirathai